
Tuchola County is a unit of territorial administration and local government (powiat) in Kuyavian-Pomeranian Voivodeship, north-central Poland. It came into being on 1 January 1999 as a result of the Polish local government reforms passed in 1998.

As of 2019 its total population is 48,329 out of which the population of Tuchola is 13,621 and the rural population is 34,708.

The county contains most of the protected area called Tuchola Landscape Park.

Neighbouring counties
Tuchola County is bordered by Starogard County to the north-east, Świecie County to the east, Bydgoszcz County to the south, Sępólno County to the south-west and Chojnice County to the west.

Administrative division
The county is subdivided into six gminas (one urban-rural and five rural). These are listed in the following table, in descending order of population.

References

 
Tuchola